"Mō Nido To..." was the first single that Beni Arashiro released under her new name BENI and label Universal Japan.

The song "Mō Nido To" is an answer song to the long charting hit "Mō Ichi do...", which sold over 80,000 copies. "Mō Nido To..." debuted at the chaku-uta charts at number #1. It August it was reported to have over 800,000 downloads from Chaka-Uta. It charted weekly on the Oricon charts on number 20. To date, the single has sold 12,400 copies.

In May 2009, the clip of "Mō Nido To" is watched over a million times on YouTube.

Track listing 
"Mō Nido To (もう二度と・・・; Never Again...)"
"STAY"
"Mō Nido To"(instrumental)
"STAY" (Instrumental)

Charts

Total Reported Sales: 12,400

References

Beni (singer) songs
2008 singles
2008 songs
Song articles with missing songwriters
Universal Music Japan singles